Pucca housing (or pukka or pacca) refers to dwellings that are designed to be solid and permanent. This term is applied to housing in South Asia built of substantial material such as stone, brick, cement, concrete, or timber.

The term pucca means "solid" and "permanent", from Hindustani / pakkā, . It is contrasted with kutcha housing (/ kaččā ), referring to buildings of flimsy construction. Pucca homes are typically made of concrete, stone, clay tiles and/or metal, in contrast to older homes made of mud and organic material.  These building methods are more costly and labor-intensive than the more traditional building methods.

In India, there is currently a large-scale effort to build pucca houses for people. The organization Indira Awas Yojana was created to help the rural poor throughout the country, by providing them with pucca houses.  267,543 houses were constructed under IAY during 2009.

Pucca houses are sometimes built to replace homes damaged by natural disasters. The permanency of pucca materials and techniques inevitably makes it less easy to adjust the house to the needs and habits of the occupants, and the relationship between house and occupants becomes more rigid, more fixed.

References

External links
 Homes through Jobs - Delivery of sustainable materials and skills for building pucca (solid + permanent) houses in rural areas

Housing in India